Pithauria is a genus of grass skippers in the family Hesperiidae.

Species
Pithauria linus Evans, 1937
Pithauria marsena (Hewitson, [1866])
Pithauria murdava (Moore, [1866])
Pithauria stramineipennis Wood-Mason & de Nicéville, [1887]

References

External links
Natural History Museum Lepidoptera genus database

Astictopterini
Butterflies of Indochina
Hesperiidae genera